Central Asia, also known as Middle Asia, is a region of Asia that stretches from the Caspian Sea in the west to western China and Mongolia in the east, and from Afghanistan and Iran in the south to Russia in the north. It includes the former Soviet republics of Kazakhstan, Kyrgyzstan, Tajikistan, Turkmenistan, and Uzbekistan, which are colloquially referred to as the "-stans" as the countries all have names ending with the Persian suffix "-stan", meaning "land of". The current geographical location of Central Asia was formerly part of the historic region of Turkestan, also known as Turan.

In the pre-Islamic and early Islamic eras ( and earlier) Central Asia was inhabited predominantly by Iranian peoples, populated by Eastern Iranian-speaking Bactrians, Sogdians, Chorasmians and the semi-nomadic Scythians and Dahae. After expansion by Turkic peoples, Central Asia also became the homeland for the Uzbeks, Kazakhs, Tatars, Turkmen, Kyrgyz, and Uyghurs; Turkic languages largely replaced the Iranian languages spoken in the area, with the exception of Tajikistan and areas where Tajik is spoken.

Central Asia was historically closely tied to the Silk Road trade routes, acting as a crossroads for the movement of people, goods, and ideas between Europe and the Far East.

From the mid-19th century until almost the end of the 20th century, Central Asia was colonised by the Russians, and incorporated into the Russian Empire, and later the Soviet Union, which led to Russians and other Slavs emigrating into the area. Modern-day Central Asia is home to a large population of European settlers, who mostly live in Kazakhstan; 7 million Russians, 500,000 Ukrainians, and about 170,000 Germans. Stalinist-era forced deportation policies also mean that over 300,000 Koreans live there.

Central Asia (2019) has a population of about 72 million people, in five countries: Kazakhstan (pop.  million), Kyrgyzstan ( million), Tajikistan ( million), Turkmenistan ( million), and Uzbekistan (35 million).

Definitions 

One of the first geographers who mentioned Central Asia as a distinct region of the world was Alexander von Humboldt. The borders of Central Asia are subject to multiple definitions. Historically, political geography and culture have been two significant parameters widely used in scholarly definitions of Central Asia. Humboldt's definition composed of every country between 5° North and 5° South of the latitude 44.5°N. Humboldt mentions some geographic features of this region, which include the Caspian Sea in the west, the Altai mountains in the north and the Hindu Kush and Pamir mountains in the South. He did not give an eastern border for the region. His legacy is still seen: Humboldt University of Berlin, named after him, offers a course in Central Asian Studies. The Russian geographer Nikolaĭ Khanykov questioned the latitudinal definition of Central Asia and preferred a physical one of all countries located in the region landlocked from water, including Afghanistan, Khorasan, Kyrgyzstan, Tajikistan, Turkmenistan, Uyghuristan (Xinjiang), and Uzbekistan.

Russian culture has two distinct terms: Средняя Азия (Srednyaya Aziya or "Middle Asia", the narrower definition, which includes only those traditionally non-Slavic, Central Asian lands that were incorporated within those borders of historical Russia) and Центральная Азия (Tsentralnaya Aziya or "Central Asia", the wider definition, which includes Central Asian lands that have never been part of historical Russia). The latter definition includes Afghanistan and 'East Turkestan'.

The most limited definition was the official one of the Soviet Union, which defined Middle Asia as consisting solely of Kyrgyzstan, Tajikistan, Turkmenistan, and Uzbekistan, omitting Kazakhstan. Soon after the dissolution of the Soviet Union in 1991, the leaders of the four former Soviet Central Asian Republics met in Tashkent and declared that the definition of Central Asia should include Kazakhstan as well as the original four included by the Soviets. Since then, this has become the most common definition of Central Asia.

The UNESCO History of the Civilizations of Central Asia, published in 1992, defines the region as "Afghanistan, northeastern Iran, northern and central Pakistan, northern India, western China, Mongolia and the former Soviet Central Asian republics".

An alternative method is to define the region based on ethnicity, and in particular, areas populated by Eastern Turkic, Eastern Iranian, or Mongolian peoples. These areas include Xinjiang Uyghur Autonomous Region, the Turkic regions of southern Siberia, the five republics, and Afghan Turkestan. Afghanistan as a whole, the northern and western areas of Pakistan and the Kashmir Valley of India may also be included. The Tibetans and Ladakhis are also included. Most of the mentioned peoples are considered the "indigenous" peoples of the vast region.  Central Asia is sometimes referred to as Turkestan.

Geography 

Central Asia is a region of varied geography, including high passes and mountains (Tian Shan), vast deserts (Kyzyl Kum, Taklamakan), and especially treeless, grassy steppes. The vast steppe areas of Central Asia are considered together with the steppes of Eastern Europe as a homogeneous geographical zone known as the Eurasian Steppe.

Much of the land of Central Asia is too dry or too rugged for farming. The Gobi desert extends from the foot of the Pamirs, 77° E, to the Great Khingan (Da Hinggan) Mountains, 116°–118° E.

Central Asia has the following geographic extremes:
 The world's northernmost desert (sand dunes), at Buurug Deliin Els, Mongolia, 50°18' N.
 The Northern Hemisphere's southernmost permafrost, at Erdenetsogt sum, Mongolia, 46°17' N.
 The world's shortest distance between non-frozen desert and permafrost: .
 The Eurasian pole of inaccessibility.

A majority of the people earn a living by herding livestock. Industrial activity centers in the region's cities.

Major rivers of the region include the Amu Darya, the Syr Darya, Irtysh, the Hari River and the Murghab River. Major bodies of water include the Aral Sea and Lake Balkhash, both of which are part of the huge west-central Asian endorheic basin that also includes the Caspian Sea.

Both of these bodies of water have shrunk significantly in recent decades due to the diversion of water from rivers that feed them for irrigation and industrial purposes. Water is an extremely valuable resource in arid Central Asia and can lead to rather significant international disputes.

Historical regions 

Central Asia is bounded on the north by the forests of Siberia. The northern half of Central Asia (Kazakhstan) is the middle part of the Eurasian steppe. Westward the Kazakh steppe merges into the Russian-Ukrainian steppe and eastward into the steppes and deserts of Dzungaria and Mongolia. Southward the land becomes increasingly dry and the nomadic population increasingly thin. The south supports areas of dense population and cities wherever irrigation is possible. The main irrigated areas are along the eastern mountains, along the Oxus and Jaxartes Rivers and along the north flank of the Kopet Dagh near the Persian border. East of the Kopet Dagh is the important oasis of Merv and then a few places in Afghanistan like Herat and Balkh. Two projections of the Tian Shan create three "bays" along the eastern mountains. The largest, in the north, is eastern Kazakhstan, traditionally called Jetysu or Semirechye which contains Lake Balkhash. In the center is the small but densely-populated Ferghana valley. In the south is Bactria, later called Tocharistan, which is bounded on the south by the Hindu Kush mountains of Afghanistan. The Syr Darya (Jaxartes) rises in the Ferghana valley and the Amu Darya (Oxus) rises in Bactria. Both flow northwest into the Aral Sea. Where the Oxus meets the Aral Sea it forms a large delta called Khwarazm and later the Khanate of Khiva. North of the Oxus is the less-famous but equally important Zarafshan River which waters the great trading cities of Bokhara and Samarkand. The other great commercial city was Tashkent northwest of the mouth of the Ferghana valley. The land immediately north of the Oxus was called Transoxiana and also Sogdia, especially when referring to the Sogdian merchants who dominated the silk road trade.

To the east, Dzungaria and the Tarim Basin were united into the Manchu-Chinese province of Xinjiang (Sinkiang; Hsin-kiang) about 1759. Caravans from China usually went along the north or south side of the Tarim basin and joined at Kashgar before crossing the mountains northwest to Ferghana or southwest to Bactria. A minor branch of the silk road went north of the Tian Shan through Dzungaria and Zhetysu before turning southwest near Tashkent. Nomadic migrations usually moved from Mongolia through Dzungaria before turning southwest to conquer the settled lands or continuing west toward Europe.

The Kyzyl Kum Desert or semi-desert is between the Oxus and Jaxartes, and the Karakum Desert is between the Oxus and Kopet Dagh in Turkmenistan. Khorasan meant approximately northeast Persia and northern Afghanistan. Margiana was the region around Merv. The Ustyurt Plateau is between the Aral and Caspian Seas.

To the southwest, across the Kopet Dagh, lies Persia. From here Persian and Islamic civilisation penetrated Central Asia and dominated its high culture until the Russian conquest. In the southeast is the route to India. In early times Buddhism spread north and throughout much of history warrior kings and tribes would move southeast to establish their rule in northern India. Most nomadic conquerors entered from the northeast. After 1800 western civilisation in its Russian and Soviet form penetrated from the northwest.

Names of historical regions 

 Ariana
 Bactria
 Dahistan
 Khorasan
 Khwarazm
 Margiana
 Parthia
 Sogdia
 Tokharistan
 Transoxiana
 Turan
 Turkestan

Climate 

Because Central Asia is landlocked and not buffered by a large body of water, temperature fluctuations are often severe, excluding the hot, sunny summer months. In most areas the climate is dry and continental, with hot summers and cool to cold winters, with occasional snowfall. Outside high-elevation areas, the climate is mostly semi-arid to arid. In lower elevations, summers are hot with blazing sunshine. Winters feature occasional rain and/or snow from low-pressure systems that cross the area from the Mediterranean Sea. Average monthly precipitation is very low from July to September, rises in autumn (October and November) and is highest in March or April, followed by swift drying in May and June. Winds can be strong, producing dust storms sometimes, especially toward the end of the summer in September and October. Specific cities that exemplify Central Asian climate patterns include Tashkent and Samarkand, Uzbekistan, Ashgabat, Turkmenistan, and Dushanbe, Tajikistan.

Biogeographically, Central Asia is part of the Palearctic realm. The largest biome in Central Asia is the temperate grasslands, savannas, and shrublands biome. Central Asia also contains the montane grasslands and shrublands, deserts and xeric shrublands and temperate coniferous forests biomes.

Climate change 

As of 2022, Central Asia is one of the most vulnerable regions to global climate change in the world and the region's temperature is growing faster than the global average.

History 

Although, during the golden age of Orientalism the place of Central Asia in the world history was marginalised, contemporary historiography has rediscovered the "centrality" of the Central Asia. The history of Central Asia is defined by the area's climate and geography. The aridness of the region made agriculture difficult, and its distance from the sea cut it off from much trade. Thus, few major cities developed in the region; instead, the area was for millennia dominated by the nomadic horse peoples of the steppe.

Relations between the steppe nomads and the settled people in and around Central Asia were long marked by conflict. The nomadic lifestyle was well suited to warfare, and the steppe horse riders became some of the most militarily potent people in the world, limited only by their lack of internal unity. Any internal unity that was achieved was most probably due to the influence of the Silk Road, which traveled along Central Asia. Periodically, great leaders or changing conditions would organise several tribes into one force and create an almost unstoppable power. These included the Hun invasion of Europe, the Five Barbarians rebellions in China and most notably the Mongol conquest of much of Eurasia.

During pre-Islamic and early Islamic times, Central Asia was inhabited predominantly by speakers of Iranian languages. Among the ancient sedentary Iranian peoples, the Sogdians and Chorasmians played an important role, while Iranian peoples such as Scythians and the later on Alans lived a nomadic or semi-nomadic lifestyle.

The main migration of Turkic peoples occurred between the 6th and 11th centuries, when they spread across most of Central Asia. The Eurasian Steppe slowly transitioned from Indo European and Iranian-speaking groups with dominant West-Eurasian ancestry to a more heterogeneous region with increasing East Asian ancestry through Turkic and Mongolian groups in the past thousands years, including extensive Turkic and later Mongol migrations out of Mongolia and slow assimilation of local populations. In the 8th century AD, the Islamic expansion reached the region but had no significant demographic impact. In the 13th century AD, the Mongolian invasion of Central Asia brought most of the region under Mongolian influence, which had "enormous demographic success", but did not impact the cultural or linguistic landscape.

Invasion routes through Central Asia 
Once populated by Iranian tribes and other Indo-European people, Central Asia experienced numerous invasions emanating out of Southern Siberia and Mongolia that would drastically affect the region. Genetic data shows that the different Central Asian Turkic-speaking peoples have between ~22% to ~70% East Asian ancestry (samplified by "Baikal hunter-gatherer ancestry" shared with other Northeast Asians and Eastern Siberians), in contrast to Iranian-speaking Central Asians, specifically Tajiks, which display genetic continuity to Indo-Iranians of the Iron Age. Certain Turkic ethnic groups, specifically the Kazakhs, display even higher East Asian ancestry. This is explained by substantial Mongolian influence on the Kazakh genome, through significant admixture between the blue eyes, blonde hair medieval Kipchaks of Central Asia with the invading medieval Mongolians. The data suggests that the Mongol invasion of Central Asia had lasting impacts onto the genetic makeup of Kazakhs.  According to recent genetic genealogy testing, the genetic admixture of the Uzbeks clusters somewhere between the Iranian peoples and the Mongols. Another study shows that the Uzbeks are closely related to other Turkic peoples of Central Asia and rather distant from Iranian people. The study also analysed the maternal and paternal DNA haplogroups and shows that Turkic speaking groups are more homogenous than Iranian speaking groups. Genetic studies analyzing the full genome of Uzbeks and other Central Asian populations found that about ~27-60% of the Uzbek ancestry is derived from East Asian sources, with the remainder ancestry (~40–73%) being made up by European and Middle Eastern components. According to a recent study, the Kyrgyz, Kazakhs, Uzbeks, and Turkmens share more of their gene pool with various East Asian and Siberian populations than with West Asian or European populations. The study further suggests that both migration and linguistic assimilation helped to spread the Turkic languages in Eurasia.

The Tang dynasty of China expanded westwards and controlled large parts of Central Asia, directly and indirectly through their Turkic vassals. Tang China actively supported the Turkification of Central Asia, while extending its cultural influence. The Tang Chinese were defeated by the Abbasid Caliphate at the Battle of Talas in 751, marking the end of the Tang dynasty's western expansion and the 150 years of Chinese influence. The Tibetan Empire would take the chance to rule portions of Central Asia and South Asia. During the 13th and 14th centuries, the Mongols conquered and ruled the largest contiguous empire in recorded history. Most of Central Asia fell under the control of the Chagatai Khanate.

The dominance of the nomads ended in the 16th century, as firearms allowed settled peoples to gain control of the region. Russia, China, and other powers expanded into the region and had captured the bulk of Central Asia by the end of the 19th century. After the Russian Revolution, the western Central Asian regions were incorporated into the Soviet Union. The eastern part of Central Asia, known as Xinjiang, was incorporated into the People's Republic of China, having been previously ruled by the Qing dynasty and the Republic of China. Mongolia gained its independence from China and has remained independent but became a Soviet satellite state until the dissolution of the Soviet Union. Afghanistan remained relatively independent of major influence by the Soviet Union until the Saur Revolution of 1978.

The Soviet areas of Central Asia saw much industrialisation and construction of infrastructure, but also the suppression of local cultures, hundreds of thousands of deaths from failed collectivisation programmes, and a lasting legacy of ethnic tensions and environmental problems. Soviet authorities deported millions of people, including entire nationalities, from western areas of the Soviet Union to Central Asia and Siberia. According to Touraj Atabaki and Sanjyot Mehendale, "From 1959 to 1970, about two million people from various parts of the Soviet Union migrated to Central Asia, of which about one million moved to Kazakhstan."

With the collapse of the Soviet Union, five countries gained independence. In nearly all the new states, former Communist Party officials retained power as local strongmen. None of the new republics could be considered functional democracies in the early days of independence, although in recent years Kyrgyzstan, Kazakhstan and Mongolia have made further progress towards more open societies, unlike Uzbekistan, Tajikistan, and Turkmenistan, which have maintained many Soviet-style repressive tactics.

Culture

Arts 

At the crossroads of Asia, shamanistic practices live alongside Buddhism. Thus, Yama, Lord of Death, was revered in Tibet as a spiritual guardian and judge. Mongolian Buddhism, in particular, was influenced by Tibetan Buddhism. The Qianlong Emperor of Qing China in the 18th century was Tibetan Buddhist and would sometimes travel from Beijing to other cities for personal religious worship.

Central Asia also has an indigenous form of improvisational oral poetry that is over 1000 years old. It is principally practiced in Kyrgyzstan and Kazakhstan by akyns, lyrical improvisationalists. They engage in lyrical battles, the aitysh or the alym sabak. The tradition arose out of early bardic oral historians. They are usually accompanied by a stringed instrument—in Kyrgyzstan, a three-stringed komuz, and in Kazakhstan, a similar two-stringed instrument, the dombra.

Photography in Central Asia began to develop after 1882, when a Russian Mennonite photographer named Wilhelm Penner moved to the Khanate of Khiva during the Mennonite migration to Central Asia led by Claas Epp, Jr. Upon his arrival to Khanate of Khiva, Penner shared his photography skills with a local student Khudaybergen Divanov, who later became the founder of Uzbek photography.

Some also learn to sing the Manas, Kyrgyzstan's epic poem (those who learn the Manas exclusively but do not improvise are called manaschis). During Soviet rule, akyn performance was co-opted by the authorities and subsequently declined in popularity. With the fall of the Soviet Union, it has enjoyed a resurgence, although akyns still do use their art to campaign for political candidates. A 2005 The Washington Post article proposed a similarity between the improvisational art of akyns and modern freestyle rap performed in the West.

As a consequence of Russian colonisation, European fine arts – painting, sculpture and graphics – have developed in Central Asia. The first years of the Soviet regime saw the appearance of modernism, which took inspiration from the Russian avant-garde movement. Until the 1980s, Central Asian arts had developed along with general tendencies of Soviet arts. In the 90s, arts of the region underwent some significant changes. Institutionally speaking, some fields of arts were regulated by the birth of the art market, some stayed as representatives of official views, while many were sponsored by international organisations. The years of 1990–2000 were times for the establishment of contemporary arts. In the region, many important international exhibitions are taking place, Central Asian art is represented in European and American museums, and the Central Asian Pavilion at the Venice Biennale has been organised since 2005.

Sports 

Equestrian sports are traditional in Central Asia, with disciplines like endurance riding, buzkashi, dzhigit and kyz kuu.

The traditional game of Buzkashi is played throughout the Central Asian region, the countries sometimes organise Buzkashi competition amongst each other. The First regional competition among the Central Asian countries, Russia, Chinese Xinjiang and Turkey was held in 2013. The first world title competition was played in 2017 and won by Kazakhstan.

Association football is popular across Central Asia. Most countries are members of the Central Asian Football Association, a region of the Asian Football Confederation. However, Kazakhstan is a member of the UEFA.

Wrestling is popular across Central Asia, with Kazakhstan having claimed 14 Olympic medals, Uzbekistan seven, and Kyrgyzstan three. As former Soviet states, Central Asian countries have been successful in gymnastics.

Mixed Martial Arts is one of more common sports in Central Asia, Kyrgyz athlete Valentina Shevchenko holding the UFC Flyweight Champion title.

Cricket is the most popular sport in Afghanistan. The Afghanistan national cricket team, first formed in 2001, has claimed wins over Bangladesh, West Indies and Zimbabwe.

Notable Kazakh competitors include cyclists Alexander Vinokourov and Andrey Kashechkin, boxer Vassiliy Jirov and Gennady Golovkin, runner Olga Shishigina, decathlete Dmitriy Karpov, gymnast Aliya Yussupova, judoka Askhat Zhitkeyev and Maxim Rakov, skier Vladimir Smirnov, weightlifter Ilya Ilyin, and figure skaters Denis Ten and Elizabet Tursynbaeva.

Notable Uzbekistani competitors include cyclist Djamolidine Abdoujaparov, boxer Ruslan Chagaev, canoer Michael Kolganov, gymnast Oksana Chusovitina, tennis player Denis Istomin, chess player Rustam Kasimdzhanov, and figure skater Misha Ge.

Economy 

Since gaining independence in the early 1990s, the Central Asian republics have gradually been moving from a state-controlled economy to a market economy. The ultimate aim is to emulate the Asian Tigers by becoming the local equivalent, Central Asian snow leopards. However, reform has been deliberately gradual and selective, as governments strive to limit the social cost and ameliorate living standards. All five countries are implementing structural reforms to improve competitiveness. Kazakhstan is the only CIS country to be included in the 2020 and 2019 IWB World Competitiveness rankings. In particular, they have been modernizing the industrial sector and fostering the development of service industries through business-friendly fiscal policies and other measures, to reduce the share of agriculture in GDP. Between 2005 and 2013, the share of agriculture dropped in all but Tajikistan, where it increased while industry decreased. The fastest growth in industry was observed in Turkmenistan, whereas the services sector progressed most in the other four countries.

Public policies pursued by Central Asian governments focus on buffering the political and economic spheres from external shocks. This includes maintaining a trade balance, minimizing public debt and accumulating national reserves. They cannot totally insulate themselves from negative exterior forces, however, such as the persistently weak recovery of global industrial production and international trade since 2008. Notwithstanding this, they have emerged relatively unscathed from the global financial crisis of 2008–2009. Growth faltered only briefly in Kazakhstan, Tajikistan and Turkmenistan and not at all in Uzbekistan, where the economy grew by more than 7% per year on average between 2008 and 2013. Turkmenistan achieved unusually high 14.7% growth in 2011. Kyrgyzstan's performance has been more erratic but this phenomenon was visible well before 2008.

The republics which have fared best benefitted from the commodities boom during the first decade of the 2000s. Kazakhstan and Turkmenistan have abundant oil and natural gas reserves and Uzbekistan's own reserves make it more or less self-sufficient. Kyrgyzstan, Tajikistan and Uzbekistan all have gold reserves and Kazakhstan has the world's largest uranium reserves. Fluctuating global demand for cotton, aluminium and other metals (except gold) in recent years has hit Tajikistan hardest, since aluminium and raw cotton are its chief exports − the Tajik Aluminium Company is the country's primary industrial asset. In January 2014, the Minister of Agriculture announced the government's intention to reduce the acreage of land cultivated by cotton to make way for other crops. Uzbekistan and Turkmenistan are major cotton exporters themselves, ranking fifth and ninth respectively worldwide for volume in 2014.

Although both exports and imports have grown significantly over the past decade, Central Asian republics countries remain vulnerable to economic shocks, owing to their reliance on exports of raw materials, a restricted circle of trading partners and a negligible manufacturing capacity. Kyrgyzstan has the added disadvantage of being considered resource poor, although it does have ample water. Most of its electricity is generated by hydropower.

The Kyrgyz economy was shaken by a series of shocks between 2010 and 2012. In April 2010, President Kurmanbek Bakiyev was deposed by a popular uprising, with former minister of foreign affairs Roza Otunbayeva assuring the interim presidency until the election of Almazbek Atambayev in November 2011. Food prices rose two years in a row and, in 2012, production at the major Kumtor gold mine fell by 60% after the site was perturbed by geological movements. According to the World Bank, 33.7% of the population was living in absolute poverty in 2010 and 36.8% a year later.

Despite high rates of economic growth in recent years, GDP per capita in Central Asia was higher than the average for developing countries only in Kazakhstan in 2013 (PPP$23,206) and Turkmenistan (PPP$14 201). It dropped to PPP$5,167 for Uzbekistan, home to 45% of the region's population, and was even lower for Kyrgyzstan and Tajikistan.

Kazakhstan leads the Central Asian region in terms of foreign direct investments. The Kazakh economy accounts for more than 70% of all the investment attracted in Central Asia.

In terms of the economic influence of big powers, China is viewed as one of the key economic players in Central Asia, especially after Beijing launched its grand development strategy known as the Belt and Road Initiative (BRI) in 2013.

The Central Asian countries attracted $378.2 billion of foreign direct investment (FDI) between 2007 and 2019. Kazakhstan accounted for 77.7% of the total FDI directed to the region. Kazakhstan is also the largest country in Central Asia accounting for more than 60 percent of the region's gross domestic product (GDP).

Central Asian nations fared better economically throughout the COVID-19 pandemic. Many variables are likely to have been at play, but disparities in economic structure, the intensity of the pandemic, and accompanying containment efforts may all be linked to part of the variety in nations' experiences. Central Asian countries are, however, predicted to be hit the worst in the future. Only 4% of permanently closed businesses anticipate to return in the future, with huge differences across sectors, ranging from 3% in lodging and food services to 27% in retail commerce.

In 2022, experts assessed that global climate change is likely to pose multiple economic risks to Central Asia and may possibly result in many billions of losses unless proper adaptation measures are developed to counter growing temperatures across the region.

Education, science and technology

Modernisation of research infrastructure 
Bolstered by strong economic growth in all but Kyrgyzstan, national development strategies are fostering new high-tech industries, pooling resources and orienting the economy towards export markets. Many national research institutions established during the Soviet era have since become obsolete with the development of new technologies and changing national priorities. This has led countries to reduce the number of national research institutions since 2009 by grouping existing institutions to create research hubs. Several of the Turkmen Academy of Science's institutes were merged in 2014: the Institute of Botany was merged with the Institute of Medicinal Plants to become the Institute of Biology and Medicinal Plants; the Sun Institute was merged with the Institute of Physics and Mathematics to become the Institute of Solar Energy; and the Institute of Seismology merged with the State Service for Seismology to become the Institute of Seismology and Atmospheric Physics. In Uzbekistan, more than 10 institutions of the Academy of Sciences have been reorganised, following the issuance of a decree by the Cabinet of Ministers in February 2012. The aim is to orient academic research towards problem-solving and ensure continuity between basic and applied research. For example, the Mathematics and Information Technology Research Institute has been subsumed under the National University of Uzbekistan and the Institute for Comprehensive Research on Regional Problems of Samarkand has been transformed into a problem-solving laboratory on environmental issues within Samarkand State University. Other research institutions have remained attached to the Uzbek Academy of Sciences, such as the Centre of Genomics and Bioinformatics.

Kazakhstan and Turkmenistan are also building technology parks as part of their drive to modernise infrastructure. In 2011, construction began of a technopark in the village of Bikrova near Ashgabat, the Turkmen capital. It will combine research, education, industrial facilities, business incubators and exhibition centres. The technopark will house research on alternative energy sources (sun, wind) and the assimilation of nanotechnologies. Between 2010 and 2012, technological parks were set up in the east, south and north Kazakhstan oblasts (administrative units) and in the capital, Astana. A Centre for Metallurgy was also established in the east Kazakhstan oblast, as well as a Centre for Oil and Gas Technologies which will be part of the planned Caspian Energy Hub. In addition, the Centre for Technology Commercialisation has been set up in Kazakhstan as part of the Parasat National Scientific and Technological Holding, a joint stock company established in 2008 that is 100% state-owned. The centre supports research projects in technology marketing, intellectual property protection, technology licensing contracts and start-ups. The centre plans to conduct a technology audit in Kazakhstan and to review the legal framework regulating the commercialisation of research results and technology.

Countries are seeking to augment the efficiency of traditional extractive sectors but also to make greater use of information and communication technologies and other modern technologies, such as solar energy, to develop the business sector, education and research. In March 2013, two research institutes were created by presidential decree to foster the development of alternative energy sources in Uzbekistan, with funding from the Asian Development Bank and other institutions: the SPU Physical−Technical Institute (Physics Sun Institute) and the International Solar Energy Institute. Three universities have been set up since 2011 to foster competence in strategic economic areas: Nazarbayev University in Kazakhstan (first intake in 2011), an international research university, Inha University in Uzbekistan (first intake in 2014), specializing in information and communication technologies, and the International Oil and Gas University in Turkmenistan (founded in 2013). Kazakhstan and Uzbekistan are both generalizing the teaching of foreign languages at school, in order to facilitate international ties. Kazakhstan and Uzbekistan have both adopted the three-tier bachelor's, master's and PhD degree system, in 2007 and 2012 respectively, which is gradually replacing the Soviet system of Candidates and Doctors of Science. In 2010, Kazakhstan became the only Central Asian member of the Bologna Process, which seeks to harmonise higher education systems in order to create a European Higher Education Area.

Financial investment in research 
The Central Asian republics' ambition of developing the business sector, education and research is being hampered by chronic low investment in research and development. Over the decade to 2013, the region's investment in research and development hovered around 0.2–0.3% of GDP. Uzbekistan broke with this trend in 2013 by raising its own research intensity to 0.41% of GDP.

Kazakhstan is the only country where the business enterprise and private non-profit sectors make any significant contribution to research and development – but research intensity overall is low in Kazakhstan: just 0.18% of GDP in 2013. Moreover, few industrial enterprises conduct research in Kazakhstan. Only one in eight (12.5%) of the country's manufacturing firms were active in innovation in 2012, according to a survey by the UNESCO Institute for Statistics. Enterprises prefer to purchase technological solutions that are already embodied in imported machinery and equipment. Just 4% of firms purchase the license and patents that come with this technology. Nevertheless, there appears to be a growing demand for the products of research, since enterprises spent 4.5 times more on scientific and technological services in 2008 than in 1997.

Trends in researchers 
Kazakhstan and Uzbekistan count the highest researcher density in Central Asia. The number of researchers per million population is close to the world average (1,083 in 2013) in Kazakhstan (1,046) and higher than the world average in Uzbekistan (1,097).

Kazakhstan is the only Central Asian country where the business enterprise and private non-profit sectors make any significant contribution to research and development. Uzbekistan is in a particularly vulnerable position, with its heavy reliance on higher education: three-quarters of researchers were employed by the university sector in 2013 and just 6% in the business enterprise sector. With most Uzbek university researchers nearing retirement, this imbalance imperils Uzbekistan's research future. Almost all holders of a Candidate of Science, Doctor of Science or PhD are more than 40 years old and half are aged over 60; more than one in three researchers (38.4%) holds a PhD degree, or its equivalent, the remainder holding a bachelor's or master's degree.

Kazakhstan, Kyrgyzstan and Uzbekistan have all maintained a share of women researchers above 40% since the fall of the Soviet Union. Kazakhstan has even achieved gender parity, with Kazakh women dominating medical and health research and representing some 45–55% of engineering and technology researchers in 2013. In Tajikistan, however, only one in three scientists (34%) was a woman in 2013, down from 40% in 2002. Although policies are in place to give Tajik women equal rights and opportunities, these are underfunded and poorly understood. Turkmenistan has offered a state guarantee of equality for women since a law adopted in 2007 but the lack of available data makes it impossible to draw any conclusions as to the law's impact on research.  As for Turkmenistan, it does not make data available on higher education, research expenditure or researchers.

Table: PhDs obtained in science and engineering in Central Asia, 2013 or closest year
Source: UNESCO Science Report: towards 2030 (2015), Table 14.1

Note: PhD graduates in science cover life sciences, physical sciences, mathematics and statistics, and computing; PhDs in engineering also cover manufacturing and construction. For Central Asia, the generic term of PhD also encompasses Candidate of Science and Doctor of Science degrees. Data are unavailable for Turkmenistan.

Table: Central Asian researchers by field of science and gender, 2013 or closest year
Source: UNESCO Science Report: towards 2030 (2015), Table 14.1

Research output 

The number of scientific papers published in Central Asia grew by almost 50% between 2005 and 2014, driven by Kazakhstan, which overtook Uzbekistan over this period to become the region's most prolific scientific publisher, according to Thomson Reuters' Web of Science (Science Citation Index Expanded). Between 2005 and 2014, Kazakhstan's share of scientific papers from the region grew from 35% to 56%. Although two-thirds of papers from the region have a foreign co-author, the main partners tend to come from beyond Central Asia, namely the Russian Federation, USA, German, United Kingdom and Japan.

Five Kazakh patents were registered at the US Patent and Trademark Office between 2008 and 2013, compared to three for Uzbek inventors and none at all for the other three Central Asian republics, Kyrgyzstan, Tajikistan and Turkmenistan.

Kazakhstan is Central Asia's main trader in high-tech products. Kazakh imports nearly doubled between 2008 and 2013, from US$2.7 billion to US$5.1 billion. There has been a surge in imports of computers, electronics and telecommunications; these products represented an investment of US$744 million in 2008 and US$2.6 billion five years later. The growth in exports was more gradual – from US$2.3 billion to US$3.1 billion – and dominated by chemical products (other than pharmaceuticals), which represented two-thirds of exports in 2008 (US$1.5 billion) and 83% (US$2.6 billion) in 2013.

International cooperation 
The five Central Asian republics belong to several international bodies, including the Organization for Security and Co-operation in Europe, the Economic Cooperation Organization and the Shanghai Cooperation Organisation. They are also members of the Central Asia Regional Economic Cooperation (CAREC) Programme, which also includes Afghanistan, Azerbaijan, China, Mongolia and Pakistan. In November 2011, the 10 member countries adopted the CAREC 2020 Strategy, a blueprint for furthering regional co-operation. Over the decade to 2020, US$50 billion is being invested in priority projects in transport, trade and energy to improve members' competitiveness. The landlocked Central Asian republics are conscious of the need to co-operate in order to maintain and develop their transport networks and energy, communication and irrigation systems. Only Kazakhstan, Azerbaijan, and Turkmenistan border the Caspian Sea and none of the republics has direct access to an ocean, complicating the transportation of hydrocarbons, in particular, to world markets.

Kazakhstan is also one of the three founding members of the Eurasian Economic Union in 2014, along with Belarus and the Russian Federation. Armenia and Kyrgyzstan have since joined this body. As co-operation among the member states in science and technology is already considerable and well-codified in legal texts, the Eurasian Economic Union is expected to have a limited additional impact on co-operation among public laboratories or academia but it should encourage business ties and scientific mobility, since it includes provision for the free circulation of labour and unified patent regulations.

Kazakhstan and Tajikistan participated in the Innovative Biotechnologies Programme (2011–2015) launched by the Eurasian Economic Community, the predecessor of the Eurasian Economic Union, The programme also involved Belarus and the Russian Federation. Within this programme, prizes were awarded at an annual bio-industry exhibition and conference. In 2012, 86 Russian organisations participated, plus three from Belarus, one from Kazakhstan and three from Tajikistan, as well as two scientific research groups from Germany. At the time, Vladimir Debabov, scientific director of the Genetika State Research Institute for Genetics and the Selection of Industrial Micro-organisms in the Russian Federation, stressed the paramount importance of developing bio-industry. "In the world today, there is a strong tendency to switch from petrochemicals to renewable biological sources", he said. "Biotechnology is developing two to three times faster than chemicals."

Kazakhstan also participated in a second project of the Eurasian Economic Community, the establishment of the Centre for Innovative Technologies on 4 April 2013, with the signing of an agreement between the Russian Venture Company (a government fund of funds), the Kazakh JSC National Agency and the Belarusian Innovative Foundation. Each of the selected projects is entitled to funding of US$3–90 million and is implemented within a public–private partnership. The first few approved projects focused on supercomputers, space technologies, medicine, petroleum recycling, nanotechnologies and the ecological use of natural resources. Once these initial projects have spawned viable commercial products, the venture company plans to reinvest the profits in new projects. This venture company is not a purely economic structure; it has also been designed to promote a common economic space among the three participating countries. Kazakhstan recognises the role civil society initiatives have to address the consequences of the COVID-19 crisis.

Four of the five Central Asian republics have also been involved in a project launched by the European Union in September 2013, IncoNet CA. The aim of this project is to encourage Central Asian countries to participate in research projects within Horizon 2020, the European Union's eighth research and innovation funding programme. The focus of this research projects is on three societal challenges considered as being of mutual interest to both the European Union and Central Asia, namely: climate change, energy and health. IncoNet CA builds on the experience of earlier projects which involved other regions, such as Eastern Europe, the South Caucasus and the Western Balkans. IncoNet CA focuses on twinning research facilities in Central Asia and Europe. It involves a consortium of partner institutions from Austria, the Czech Republic, Estonia, Germany, Hungary, Kazakhstan, Kyrgyzstan, Poland, Portugal, Tajikistan, Turkey and Uzbekistan. In May 2014, the European Union launched a 24-month call for project applications from twinned institutions – universities, companies and research institutes – for funding of up to €10, 000 to enable them to visit one another's facilities to discuss project ideas or prepare joint events like workshops.

The International Science and Technology Center (ISTC) was established in 1992 by the European Union, Japan, the Russian Federation and the US to engage weapons scientists in civilian research projects and to foster technology transfer. ISTC branches have been set up in the following countries party to the agreement: Armenia, Belarus, Georgia, Kazakhstan, Kyrgyzstan and Tajikistan. The headquarters of ISTC were moved to Nazarbayev University in Kazakhstan in June 2014, three years after the Russian Federation announced its withdrawal from the centre.

Kyrgyzstan, Tajikistan and Kazakhstan have been members of the World Trade Organization since 1998, 2013 and 2015 respectively.

Territorial and regional data

Demographics 

By a broad definition including Mongolia and Afghanistan, more than 90 million people live in Central Asia, about 2% of Asia's total population. Of the regions of Asia, only North Asia has fewer people. It has a population density of 9 people per km2, vastly less than the 80.5 people per km2 of the continent as a whole. Kazakhstan is one of the least densely populated countries in the world.

Languages 
Russian, as well as being spoken by around six million ethnic Russians and Ukrainians of Central Asia, is the de facto lingua franca throughout the former Soviet Central Asian Republics. Mandarin Chinese has an equally dominant presence in Inner Mongolia, Qinghai and Xinjiang.

The languages of the majority of the inhabitants of the former Soviet Central Asian Republics belong to the Turkic language group. Turkmen is mainly spoken in Turkmenistan, and as a minority language in Afghanistan, Russia, Iran and Turkey. Kazakh and Kyrgyz are related languages of the Kypchak group of Turkic languages and are spoken throughout Kazakhstan, Kyrgyzstan, and as a minority language in Tajikistan, Afghanistan and Xinjiang. Uzbek and Uyghur are spoken in Uzbekistan, Tajikistan, Kyrgyzstan, Afghanistan and Xinjiang.

The Turkic languages may belong to a larger, but controversial, Altaic language family, which includes Mongolian. Mongolian is spoken throughout Mongolia and into Buryatia, Kalmyk, Inner Mongolia, and Xinjiang.

Middle Iranian languages were once spoken throughout Central Asia, such as the once prominent Sogdian, Khwarezmian, Bactrian and Scythian, which are now extinct and belonged to the Eastern Iranian family. The Eastern Iranian Pashto language is still spoken in Afghanistan and northwestern Pakistan. Other minor Eastern Iranian languages such as Shughni, Munji, Ishkashimi, Sarikoli, Wakhi, Yaghnobi and Ossetic are also spoken at various places in Central Asia. Varieties of Persian are also spoken as a major language in the region, locally known as Dari (in Afghanistan), Tajik (in Tajikistan and Uzbekistan), and Bukhori (by the Bukharan Jews of Central Asia).

Tocharian, another Indo-European language group, which was once predominant in oases on the northern edge of the Tarim Basin of Xinjiang, is now extinct.

Other language groups include the Tibetic languages, spoken by around six million people across the Tibetan Plateau and into Qinghai, Sichuan (Szechwan), Ladakh and Baltistan, and the Nuristani languages of northeastern Afghanistan. Korean is spoken by the Koryo-saram minority, mainly in Kazakhstan and Uzbekistan.

Religions 

Islam is the religion most common in the Central Asian Republics, Afghanistan, Xinjiang, and the peripheral western regions, such as Bashkortostan. Most Central Asian Muslims are Sunni, although there are sizable Shia minorities in Afghanistan and Tajikistan.

Buddhism and Zoroastrianism were the major faiths in Central Asia before the arrival of Islam. Zoroastrian influence is still felt today in such celebrations as Nowruz, held in all five of the Central Asian states. The transmission of Buddhism along the Silk Road eventually brought the religion to China. Amongst the Turkic peoples, Tengrism was the leading religion before Islam. Tibetan Buddhism is most common in Tibet, Mongolia, Ladakh, and the southern Russian regions of Siberia.

The form of Christianity most practiced in the region in previous centuries was Nestorianism, but now the largest denomination is the Russian Orthodox Church, with many members in Kazakhstan, where about 25% of the population of 19 million identify as Christian, 17% in Uzbekistan and 5% in Kyrgyzstan.

The Bukharan Jews were once a sizable community in Uzbekistan and Tajikistan, but nearly all have emigrated since the dissolution of the Soviet Union.

In Siberia, shaministic practices persist, including forms of divination such as Kumalak.

Contact and migration with Han people from China has brought Confucianism, Daoism, Mahayana Buddhism, and other Chinese folk beliefs into the region.

Geostrategy 

Central Asia has long been a strategic location merely because of its proximity to several great powers on the Eurasian landmass. The region itself never held a dominant stationary population nor was able to make use of natural resources. Thus, it has rarely throughout history become the seat of power for an empire or influential state. Central Asia has been divided, redivided, conquered out of existence, and fragmented time and time again. Central Asia has served more as the battleground for outside powers than as a power in its own right.

Central Asia had both the advantage and disadvantage of a central location between four historical seats of power. From its central location, it has access to trade routes to and from all the regional powers. On the other hand, it has been continuously vulnerable to attack from all sides throughout its history, resulting in political fragmentation or outright power vacuum, as it is successively dominated.
 To the North, the steppe allowed for rapid mobility, first for nomadic horseback warriors like the Huns and Mongols, and later for Russian traders, eventually supported by railroads. As the Russian Empire expanded to the East, it would also push down into Central Asia towards the sea, in a search for warm water ports. The Soviet bloc would reinforce dominance from the North and attempt to project power as far south as Afghanistan.
 To the East, the demographic and cultural weight of Chinese empires continually pushed outward into Central Asia since the Silk Road period of Han Dynasty. However, with the Sino-Soviet split and collapse of Soviet Union, China would project its soft power into Central Asia, most notably in the case of Afghanistan, to counter Russian dominance of the region.
 To the Southeast, the demographic and cultural influence of India was felt in Central Asia, notably in Tibet, the Hindu Kush, and slightly beyond. From its base in India, the British Empire competed with the Russian Empire for influence in the region in the 19th and 20th centuries.
 To the Southwest, Western Asian powers have expanded into the southern areas of Central Asia (usually Uzbekistan, Afghanistan, and Turkmenistan). Several Persian empires would conquer and reconquer parts of Central Asia; Alexander the Great's Hellenic empire would extend into Central Asia; two Islamic empires would exert substantial influence throughout the region; and the modern state of Iran has projected influence throughout the region as well. Turkey, through a common Turkic nation identity, has gradually increased its ties and influence as well in the region. Furthermore, since Uzbekistan announced their intention to join in April 2018, Turkey and all of the Central Asian Turkic-speaking states except Turkmenistan are together part of the Turkic Council.

In the post–Cold War era, Central Asia is an ethnic cauldron, prone to instability and conflicts, without a sense of national identity, but rather a mess of historical cultural influences, tribal and clan loyalties, and religious fervor. Projecting influence into the area is no longer just Russia, but also Turkey, Iran, China, Pakistan, India and the United States:
 Russia continues to dominate political decision-making throughout the former SSRs; although, as other countries move into the area, Russia's influence has begun to wane though Russia still maintains military bases in Kyrgyzstan and Tajikistan.
 The United States, with its military involvement in the region and oil diplomacy, is also significantly involved in the region's politics. The United States and other NATO members are the main contributors to the International Security Assistance Force in Afghanistan and also exert considerable influence in other Central Asian nations.
 China has security ties with Central Asian states through the Shanghai Cooperation Organisation, and conducts energy trade bilaterally.
 India has geographic proximity to the Central Asian region and, in addition, enjoys considerable influence on Afghanistan. India maintains a military base at Farkhor, Tajikistan, and also has extensive military relations with Kazakhstan and Uzbekistan.
 Turkey also exerts considerable influence in the region on account of its ethnic and linguistic ties with the Turkic peoples of Central Asia and its involvement in the Baku-Tbilisi-Ceyhan oil pipeline. Political and economic relations are growing rapidly (e.g., Turkey recently eliminated visa requirements for citizens of the Central Asian Turkic republics).
 Iran, the seat of historical empires that controlled parts of Central Asia, has historical and cultural links to the region and is vying to construct an oil pipeline from the Caspian Sea to the Persian Gulf.
 Pakistan, a nuclear-armed Islamic state, has a history of political relations with neighbouring Afghanistan and is termed capable of exercising influence. For some Central Asian nations, the shortest route to the ocean lies through Pakistan. Pakistan seeks natural gas from Central Asia and supports the development of pipelines from its countries. According to an independent study, Turkmenistan is supposed to be the fifth largest natural gas field in the world. The mountain ranges and areas in northern Pakistan lie on the fringes of greater Central Asia; the Gilgit–Baltistan region of Pakistan lies adjacent to Tajikistan, separated only by the narrow Afghan Wakhan Corridor. Being located on the northwest of South Asia, the area forming modern-day Pakistan maintained extensive historical and cultural links with the central Asian region.
 Japan has an important and growing influence in Central Asia, with the master plan of the capital city of Astana in Kazakhstan being designed by Japanese architect Kisho Kurokawa, and the Central Asia plus Japan initiative designed to strengthen ties between them and promote development and stability of the region.

Russian historian Lev Gumilev wrote that Xiongnu, Mongols (Mongol Empire, Zunghar Khanate) and Turkic peoples (First Turkic Khaganate, Uyghur Khaganate) played a role to stop Chinese aggression to the north. The Turkic Khaganate had special policy against Chinese assimilation policy. Another interesting theoretical analysis on the historical-geopolitics of the Central Asia was made through the reinterpretation of Orkhun Inscripts.

The region, along with Russia, is also part of "the great pivot" as per the Heartland Theory of Halford Mackinder, which says that the power which controls Central Asia—richly endowed with natural resources—shall ultimately be the "empire of the world".

War on Terror 
In the context of the United States' War on Terror, Central Asia has once again become the center of geostrategic calculations. Pakistan's status has been upgraded by the U.S. government to Major non-NATO ally because of its central role in serving as a staging point for the invasion of Afghanistan, providing intelligence on Al-Qaeda operations in the region, and leading the hunt on Osama bin Laden.

Afghanistan, which had served as a haven and source of support for Al-Qaeda under the protection of Mullah Omar and the Taliban, was the target of a U.S. invasion in 2001 and ongoing reconstruction and drug-eradication efforts. U.S. military bases have also been established in Uzbekistan and Kyrgyzstan, causing both Russia and the People's Republic of China to voice their concern over a permanent U.S. military presence in the region.

Western governments have accused Russia, China and the former Soviet republics of justifying the suppression of separatist movements, and the associated ethnics and religion with the War on Terror.

Major cultural, scientific and economic centres

Cities in Central Asia

See also 

 Chinese Central Asia: Western Regions
 Central Asian Football Federation
 Central Asian Games
 Central Asia Regional Economic Cooperation Program
 Central Asian studies
 Central Asian Union
 Mountains of Central Asia
 Central Asians in Ancient Indian literature
 Continental pole of inaccessibility
 Economic Cooperation Organization
 Hindutash
 Inner Asia
 Russian Turkestan
 Soviet Central Asia
 Transoxiana

References

Citations

Sources

Further reading 
 
 Chow, Edward. "Central Asia's Pipelines: Field of Dreams and Reality", in Pipeline Politics in Asia: The Intersection of Demand, Energy Markets, and Supply Routes. National Bureau of Asian Research, 2010.
 Farah, Paolo Davide, Energy Security, Water Resources and Economic Development in Central Asia, World Scientific Reference on Globalisation in Eurasia and the Pacific Rim, Imperial College Press (London, UK) & World Scientific Publishing, November 2015. Available at SSRN: http://ssrn.com/abstract=2701215
 Dani, A.H. and V.M. Masson, eds. History of Civilizations of Central Asia. Paris: UNESCO, 1992.* Gorshunova. Olga V. Svjashennye derevja Khodzhi Barora..., (Sacred Trees of Khodzhi Baror: Phytolatry and the Cult of Female Deity in Central Asia) in Etnoragraficheskoe Obozrenie, 2008, n° 1, pp. 71–82. . .
 
 
 Mandelbaum, Michael, ed. Central Asia and the World: Kazakhstan, Uzbekistan, Tajikistan, Kyrgyzstan, and Turkmenistan. New York: Council on Foreign Relations Press, 1994.
 Marcinkowski, M. Ismail. Persian Historiography and Geography: Bertold Spuler on Major Works Produced in Iran, the Caucasus, Central Asia, Pakistan and Early Ottoman Turkey. Singapore: Pustaka Nasional, 2003.
 Olcott, Martha Brill. Central Asia's New States: Independence, Foreign policy, and Regional security. Washington, D.C.: United States Institute of Peace Press, 1996.
 
 Hasan Bulent Paksoy. ALPAMYSH: Central Asian Identity under Russian Rule. Hartford: AACAR, 1989. http://vlib.iue.it/carrie/texts/carrie_books/paksoy-1/
 Soucek, Svatopluk. A History of Inner Asia. Cambridge: Cambridge University Press, 2000.
 Rall, Ted. Silk Road to Ruin: Is Central Asia the New Middle East? New York: NBM Publishing, 2006.
 Stone, L.A. The International Politics of Central Eurasia (272 pp). Central Eurasian Studies On Line: Accessible via the Web Page of the International Eurasian Institute for Economic and Political Research: https://web.archive.org/web/20071103154944/http://www.iicas.org/forumen.htm
 Trochev, Alexei; Slade, Gavin (2019), in Caron, Jean-François (ed.), "Trials and Tribulations: Kazakhstan's Criminal Justice Reforms", Kazakhstan and the Soviet Legacy, Singapore: Springer Singapore, pp. 75–99, retrieved 4 December 2020.
 Vakulchuk, Roman (2014) Kazakhstan's Emerging Economy: Between State and Market, Peter Lang: Frankfurt/Main. Available at: www.researchgate.net/publication/299731455
 Weston, David. Teaching about Inner Asia, Bloomington, Indiana: ERIC Clearinghouse for Social Studies, 1989.
 Yellinek, Roie, The Impact of China's Belt and Road Initiative on Central Asia and the South Caucasus, E-International Relations, 14 February 2020.

External links 

 
 Central Asia ethnicity, languages, and religious composition maps at Columbia University
 General Map of Central Asia I – World Digital Library a historic map from 1874

 
Regions of Asia
Regions of Eurasia